Nelson Mandela's electoral victory in the first democratic 1994 general election signified the end of apartheid in South Africa, a system of widespread racially-based segregation to enforce almost complete separation of different races in South Africa. Under the apartheid system, South Africans were classified into four different races: White, Black, Coloured, and Indian/Asian, with about 80% of the South African population classified as Black, 9% as White, 9% as Coloured, and 2% as Indian/Asian. Under apartheid, Whites held almost all political power in South Africa, with other races almost completely marginalised from the political process.

While the end of apartheid allowed equal rights for all South Africans regardless of race, post-apartheid South Africa struggles to correct the social inequalities created by decades of apartheid. Despite a growing gross domestic product, indices for poverty, unemployment, income inequality, life expectancy and land ownership, have declined due to the increase in population; with the end of the apartheid system in South Africa leaving the country socio-economically stratified by race. Subsequent government policies have sought to correct inequity with varying amounts of success.

Possible causes of post-apartheid inequality

Unemployment
South Africa has extremely high unemployment rates. The overall unemployment rate was 26% in 2004,  Redistribution aims to transfer White-owned commercial farms to Black South Africans.  Restitution involves giving compensation to land lost to Whites due to  apartheid, racism, and discrimination.  Land tenure reform strives to provide more secure access to land.  
Several laws have been enacted to facilitate redistribution, restitution, and land tenure reform. The Provision of Certain Land of Settlement Act of 1996 designates land for settlement purposes and ensures financial assistance to those seeking to acquire land.  The Restitution of Land Rights Act of 1994 guided the implementation of restitution and gave it a legal basis.  The Extension of Security of Tenure Act of 1996 helps rural communities obtain stronger rights to their land and regulates the relationships between owners of rural land and those living on it.  
So far, these land reform measures have been semi-effective. By 1998, over 250,000 Black South Africans received land as a result of the Land Redistribution Programme.  Very few restitution claims have been resolved.  In the five years following the land reform programmes were instituted, only 1% of land changed hands, despite the African National Congress’s goal of 30%.

The Reconstruction and Development Programme
The Reconstruction and Development Programme (RDP) was a socio-economic programme aimed at addressing racial inequalities by creating business and education while only 4% of the wealthiest students are functionally illiterate, indicating a stark divide in literacy between income quartiles. The spatial segregation of apartheid continues to affect educational opportunities. Black and low-income students face geographic barriers to good schools, which are usually located in affluent neighbourhoods.
While South Africans enter higher education in increasing numbers, there is still a stark difference in the racial distribution of these students.

Currently, about 58.5% of Whites and 51% of Indians enter some form of higher education, compared to only 14.3% of Coloureds and 12% of Blacks. As of 2013, the global competitiveness survey ranked South Africa last out of 148 for the quality of maths and science education and 146th out of 148 for the quality of general education, behind almost all African countries despite one of the largest budgets for education on the African continent. The same report lists the biggest obstacle to doing business as an "Inadequately educated workforce". Education, therefore, remains one of the poorest areas of performance in post-apartheid South Africa and one of the biggest causes of continued inequality and poverty.

See also
Apartheid in South Africa
Negotiations to end apartheid in South Africa
Crime of apartheid
Sexual violence in South Africa

References

Apartheid in South Africa
History of South Africa
Racism in South Africa
Racial segregation